The United States Post Office at 81 N. Forest St. in Camden, Tennessee was built in 1936.  It was listed on the National Register of Historic Places in 1988.

Design credit is given to U.S. Treasury department's supervising architect Louis A. Simon and the Treasury's Neal A. Melick, an engineer, is credited as builder.

It is an L-shaped  one-story building.

References

Post office buildings in Tennessee
National Register of Historic Places in Benton County, Tennessee
Government buildings completed in 1936